John Shawe was an English Puritan minister.

John Shawe may also refer to:

John Shawe (died 1407), MP for Oxford
John Shawe (died 1431), MP for Oxford

See also
John Shaw (disambiguation)
John Shore (disambiguation)